Garfield is a city in Pawnee County, Kansas, United States.  As of the 2020 census, the population of the city was 151.

History
Garfield is named for James A. Garfield, the 20th President of the United States.

The first post office in Garfield was established in 1873.

Geography
Garfield is located at  (38.076310, -99.244994).

Demographics

2010 census
At the 2010 census, there were 190 people, 82 households and 49 families residing in the city. The racial makeup was 92.6% White, 2.1% Native American, and 5.3% from two or more races. Hispanic or Latino of any race were 6.8% of the population.

There were 82 households, of which 17.1% had children under the age of 18 living with them, 52.4% were married couples living together, 6.1% had a female householder with no husband present, 1.2% had a male householder with no wife present, and 40.2% were non-families. 32.9% of all households were made up of individuals, and 21.9% had someone living alone who was 65 years of age or older. The average household size was 2.32 and the average family size was 2.90.

The median age was 49.4 years. 20.5% of residents were under the age of 18; 6.9% were between the ages of 18 and 24; 16.9% were from 25 to 44; 35.3% were from 45 to 64; and 20.5% were 65 years of age or older. The gender makeup of the city was 45.8% male and 54.2% female.

2000 census
At the 2000 census, there were 198 people, 83 households and 62 families residing in the city. The racial makeup was 97.98% White, 0.51% African American, 0.51% Native American, 0.51% from other races, and 0.51% from two or more races. Hispanic or Latino of any race were 0.51% of the population.

There were 83 households, of which 31.3% had children under the age of 18 living with them, 60.2% were married couples living together, 8.4% had a female householder with no husband present, and 25.3% were non-families. 24.1% of all households were made up of individuals, and 10.8% had someone living alone who was 65 years of age or older. The average household size was 2.39 and the average family size was 2.74.

25.3% of the population were under the age of 18, 6.6% from 18 to 24, 21.2% from 25 to 44, 26.3% from 45 to 64, and 20.7% who were 65 years of age or older. The median age was 42 years. For every 100 females, there were 98.0 males. For every 100 females age 18 and over, there were 94.7 males.

The median household income was $38,500 and the median family income was $39,583. Males had a median income of $23,750 and females $21,250. The per capita income was $15,767. About 4.5% of families and 5.8% of the population were below the poverty line, including 2.1% of those under the age of eighteen and 4.8% of those 65 or over.

Education
The community is served by Fort Larned USD 495 public school district.

See also
 Santa Fe Trail

References

Further reading

External links

 Garfield - Directory of Public Officials
 USD 495, local school district
 Garfield city map, KDOT

Cities in Kansas
Cities in Pawnee County, Kansas
Kansas populated places on the Arkansas River